The Political Equality League was a group active in Manitoba, Canada between 1912 and 1916 that successfully lobbied for women's suffrage at the provincial level. One of the highlights of the campaign was a mock parliament in which Nellie McClung parodied the Conservative premier Rodmond Roblin, with a parliament of women dismissing men's claims for rights using the same arguments used by men to dismiss women's claims.

Foundation

The Political Equality League was founded in March 1912 during a meeting at the Winnipeg home of Mrs. Jane Hample.
The founders were progressive middle-class men and women, mostly well-educated professionals of Anglo-Saxon origin. Typically they believed in the Social Gospel.
The main goal was to achieve the right of women to vote, but the league also was active in issues such as tariffs, labor law and prohibition of alcohol.

Members of the Winnipeg branch of the Canadian Women's Press Club formed the nucleus of the league and included Francis Marion Beynon, Lillian Beynon Thomas, Nellie McClung and Ella Cora Hind.
Lynn and Winona Flett also joined, as did men such as George Fisher Chipman and Fred Dixon.

Dixon was elected secretary-treasurer, and his future wife Winona Flett was made superintendent of literature.
Lillian Beynon Thomas was the first president, but Dr. Mary E. Crawford soon took over the leadership.

Activities

Unlike organizations in Britain at the time, the league avoided violence and campaigned by distributing pamphlets, organizing petitions and staging peaceful demonstrations.
Speakers such as Lillian Beynon Thomas and Nellie McClung gave talks on suffrage and maternal feminism at theaters and halls across Manitoba, often encountering a hostile reception. According to McClung the government of Rodmond Roblin sent "stooges" to cause trouble at the meetings.
In 1913 the league presented a petition signed by 20,000 men to Tobias Norris, leader of the Liberal Party. 
He agreed to support female suffrage.

Mock parliament

On 28 January 1914 the League presented a mock parliament at the Walker Theatre.
Lillian Thomas wrote the satire, which starred Nellie McClung as premier of a province in which women were the political leaders and men led sheltered lives. 
McClung visited the provincial legislature with a delegation of reformers the day before the show.
She called for women to have the vote so they could address evils such as alcoholism and prostitution, but was informed by Roblin that "nice women don't want the vote." McClung noted Roblin's  gestures and way of speaking.
She used her observations with wicked effect the next evening when playing the premier of a legislature composed of women. After the women had dealt with issues such as suitable male clothing and labor saving devices for men, and had dismissed dower rights for men, a delegation of men arrived with a wheelbarrow full of petitions for the right to vote.
McClung (a tiny woman) brought the house down as she parodied the domineering premier Rodmond, rocking on her heels, twiddling her fingers and loudly proclaiming,

The mock parliament was a great success, and was followed by repeat performances.
Earnings from the play financed the suffrage campaign that followed.
The Winnipeg Telegram described the first performance, to a packed house,

Provincial elections
In the lead-up to the 1914 provincial elections the League campaigned for Dixon as an independent and for the Liberals, using political meetings to make the suffrage argument that "all sane adult persons [must] have equal voice in the making of laws which they have equally to obey."
Nellie McClung and Lillian Thomas spoke at the Liberal convention, the first time in Canada women had spoken at such an important political event.
During the election campaign Tobias Norris proclaimed: 

Despite the league's efforts, the Conservatives won the election of July 1914.
However, on 12 May 1915 Roblin and his entire cabinet were forced to resign due to a corruption scandal. In the subsequent provincial election of 6 August 1915 the Liberals under Norris won by a landslide.

In August Norris said he would introduce legislation on women's suffrage if he received a petition with at least 20,000 signatures.
In December a delegation of sixteen men and women formally presented two petitions to Norris with more than 40,000 names in total.
The 93-year-old Amelia Burritt was one of the most active in getting signatures, reaping 4,000 in a door-to-door campaign in Winnipeg.
The first draft of the bill excluded women from election to the legislature. When the league noticed this, they threatened to raise the omission with the Manitoba Grain Growers' Association, which was holding its convention. The government hastily revised the draft to allow women to sit in the house.
The act giving full provincial suffrage to women passed in January 1916, making Manitoba the first province in Canada to give women full political rights.
The league was no longer active after 1916, but during its short existence had made a fundamental impact on politics in Manitoba.

References

Sources

Women's suffrage in Canada
Organizations established in 1912
1912 establishments in Manitoba